The 2022 BYU Cougars women's soccer team represents Brigham Young University during the 2022 NCAA Division I women's soccer season. The Cougars were coached for a 28th consecutive season by Jennifer Rockwood, who was co-coach in 1995 and became the solo head coach in 1996. Before 1995 BYU women's soccer competed as a club team and not as a member of the NCAA. Overall the Cougars have made the NCAA tournament in 22 of the 27 seasons that Rockwood has been the head coach. Joining Rockwood as assistant coaches are Brent Anderson (6th season) and Steve Magleby (5th season) with volunteer assistants Rachel Jorgensen (7th season) and Madie Gates (9th season). The Cougars come off of a season where they were co-champions in the WCC and went 17–4–3, 8–1–0 in the WCC. The Cougars went on to  advance to their first ever College Cup, and tied in the championship with Florida State before losing on penalties to finish as national runner–up.  The Cougars staff was also named the Women's Staff of the Year. The Cougars enter 2022 having been picked to win the WCC Championship  in their final season before heading to the Big 12 Conference for the 2023 season.

Personnel

Roster

Media

Television & Internet Streaming 
Most BYU women's soccer will have a TV broadcast or internet video stream available. BYUtv and WCC Network will once again serve as the primary providers. Information on these television and streaming broadcasts can be found under each individual match.

Nu Skin BYU Sports Network 

For a ninth consecutive season the BYU Sports Network will air BYU Cougars women's soccer games. Greg Wrubell will provide play-by-play for most games with Jason Shepherd filling-in when Wrubell has football or basketball duties. BYU Radio's KUMT station 107.9 FM will act as the flagship stations for women's soccer, though the BYU Radio App and byuradio.org will carry a few games exclusively. 

Affiliates
BYU Radio- KUMT 107.9 FM

Schedule and results
{| class="toccolours" width=95% style="margin:1.5em auto; text-align:center;"
|-style=""
! colspan=2|2022 BYU Cougars women's soccer Game Log
|-
! colspan=2 | Legend:       = Win       = Loss       = Tie       = Canceled      Bold = BYU team member

|-style=""
! colspan=2 |Exhibition (0–1–0)
|- valign="top"
|

|-
|
|-style=""
! colspan=2 |Regular Season (8–2–5)
|- valign="top"
|

|-
|

|-
|

|-
|

|-
| * indicates a non-conference game. All rankings from the United Soccer Coaches Poll on the date of the contest.
|}

Announcers
North Carolina: Greg Wrubell & Rachel Jorgensen (BYU Radio App)
Cal State Fullerton: Kienan Dixon & Michael Martinez (ESPN+); Greg Wrubell & Rachel Jorgensen (BYU Radio 107.9 FM & App) 
Ohio State: Dean Linke & Lauren Link (BTN); Greg Wrubell & Rachel Jorgensen (BYU Radio 107.9 FM & App)  
Colorado: Spencer Linton,  Carla Haslam, & Jason Shepherd (byutv.org); Greg Wrubell & Rachel Jorgensen (BYU Radio 107.9 FM & App)  
Alabama: Jason Shepherd & Carla Haslam (byutv.org); Greg Wrubell & Rachel Jorgensen (BYU Radio 107.9 FM & App)
CSUN: Landon Southwick & Carla Haslam (byutv.org); Jason Shepherd & Rachel Jorgensen (BYU Radio 107.9 FM & App)
Arkansas: Spencer Linton, Carla Haslam, & Jason Shepherd (BYUtv); Greg Wrubell & Rachel Jorgensen (BYU Radio 107.9 FM & App)
Utah Valley: Jarom Jordan & Carla Haslam (byutv.org); Jason Shepherd & Rachel Jorgensen (BYU Radio 107.9 FM & App)
Utah State: Verl Johansen & Stockton Jewkes (SCS Central); Greg Wrubell & Rachel Jorgensen (BYU Radio 107.9 FM & App)
Utah: Jarom Jordan & Carla Haslam (BYUtv); Jason Shepherd & Rachel Jorgensen (BYU Radio 107.9 FM & App)
Saint Mary's: Brian Brownfield & Rodrigo Donor (SCS Pacific); Greg Wrubell & Rachel Jorgensen (BYU Radio App) 
San Francisco: Jarom Jordan, Carla Haslam, & Jason Shepherd (BYUtv); Greg Wrubell & Rachel Jorgensen (BYU Radio 107.9 FM & App)
Pacific: Dennis Ackerman (SCS Pacific); Jason Shepherd & Rachel Jorgensen (BYU Radio 107.9 FM & App)
Portland: Spencer Linton & Carla Haslam (byutv.org); Jason Shepherd & Rachel Jorgensen (BYU Radio 107.9 FM & App)
Pepperdine: Christian Miles (SCS Atlantic); Greg Wrubell & Rachel Jorgensen (BYU Radio 107.9 FM & App)
Gonzaga: Jarom Jordan & Carla Haslam (byutv.org); Jason Shepherd & Rachel Jorgensen (BYU Radio 107.9 FM & App)
Santa Clara: Spencer Linton, Carla Haslam, & Jason Shepherd (BYUtv); Greg Wrubell & Rachel Jorgensen (BYU Radio 107.9 FM & App) 
San Diego: Braden Surprenant (WCC Net); Greg Wrubell & Rachel Jorgensen (BYU Radio 107.9 FM & App)
Loyola Marymount: Jonathan Grace (SCS Atlantic); Jason Shepherd & Rachel Jorgensen (BYU Radio 107.9 FM & App)

Rankings

References 

2022 in sports in Utah
2022 West Coast Conference women's soccer season
2022 team
2022 NCAA Division I women's soccer season
BYU